II (Anh. II; second Annex) of the 1978 edition of the Deutsch catalogue lists four arrangements by Franz Schubert, of compositions by other composers.

Table

Legend

List

|-
| data-sort-value="999.0999201" |
| data-sort-value="999.201" | Anh.II/1
| data-sort-value="ZZZZ" |
| data-sort-value="ZZZZ" |
| data-sort-value="801,00" | VIII, 1
| data-sort-value="Arrangement of Gluck's Iphigenie en Aulide, overture" | Arrangement of Gluck's overture to Iphigénie en Aulide
| data-sort-value="ZZZZ" |
| data-sort-value="1810-01-01" | early 1810?
| Fragment for piano duet: last bars of the Primo part extant
|-
| data-sort-value="096" | 96
| data-sort-value="999.202" | Anh.II/2
| data-sort-value="XXX,1926" | (1926)
| data-sort-value="ZZZZ" |
| data-sort-value="801,00" | VIII, 1
| Arrangement of Matiegka's Notturno (Trio), Op. 21, a.k.a. Quartet, D Anh. II/2
| data-sort-value="key G major" | G major
| data-sort-value="1814-02-26" | 26/2/1814
| For flute, viola, guitar, and a cello part added by Schubert; Movements 2 (Trio II) and 5 (Var. II) recomposed by Schubert
|-
| data-sort-value="999.0999203" |
| data-sort-value="999.203" | Anh.II/3
| data-sort-value="ZZZZ" |
| data-sort-value="ZZZZ" |
| data-sort-value="801,00" | VIII, 1
| data-sort-value="Arrangement of Gluck's Echo et Narcisse, arias, 2, from" | Arrangement of two arias from Gluck's Echo et Narcisse
| data-sort-value="text Rien de la nature" | Rien de la nature – O combats, o désordre extrème!
| data-sort-value="1816-03-01" | March 1816
| data-sort-value="Text by Tschudi, Jean-Baptiste-Louis-Théodore de, Rien de la nature" | Text by Tschudi
|-
| data-sort-value="999.0999204" |
| data-sort-value="999.204" | Anh.II/4
| data-sort-value="XXX,1960" | (1960)
| data-sort-value="ZZZZ" |
| data-sort-value="801,00" | VIII, 1
| data-sort-value="Arrangement of Stadler's 8th Psalm" | Arrangement of M. Stadler's 8th Psalm (Zwölf Psalmen David's No. 1: "Unendlicher! Gott, unser Herr!")
| data-sort-value="text Dem Sangmeister auf Gittith, ein Psalm Davids" | Dem Sangmeister auf Gittith, ein Psalm Davids
| data-sort-value="1823-08-29" | 29/8/1823
| data-sort-value="Text by Mendelssohn, Moses Psalm 008" | Text by Mendelssohn, M., translating Psalm 8; For voice and orchestra; Schubert adapted and orchestrated the piano accompaniment, slightly modifying the vocal part
|}

Lists of compositions by Franz Schubert
Compositions by Franz Schubert